Bacanda is a town in southern Ivory Coast. It is a sub-prefecture of Grand-Lahou Department in Grands-Ponts Region, Lagunes District.

Bacanda was a commune until March 2012, when it became one of 1126 communes nationwide that were abolished.

In 2014, the population of the sub-prefecture of Bacanda was 20,950.

Villages
The 8 villages of the sub-prefecture of Bacanda and their population in 2014 are:
 Adjekonankro (1 645)
 Agnikro (1 088)
 Bacanda (9 174)
 Botindin (1 536)
 Gbedjenou (2 314)
 Godesso (2 513)
 Siekro (1 776)
 Tagbanasso (904)

References

Sub-prefectures of Grands-Ponts
Former communes of Ivory Coast